Samuel Adler may refer to:
Samuel Adler (rabbi) (1809–1891), Reform rabbi
Samuel Adler (composer) (born 1928), composer and conductor
Samuel Adler (artist) (1898–1979), American artist